Alūksne may refer to the following places in Latvia:

Alūksne, a town
Alūksne municipality
Alūksne District (defunct)
Lake Alūksne
Alūksne River
Alūksne Upland
Alūksne Castle